Schakt was a series of Swedish horror short story anthologies published between 2005 and 2007, with Kent Björnsson as editor and publisher.  The series published five anthologies before it was discontinued: Mytiska maskiner och andra mardrömmar, Skrämmande skogar och andra osunda platser, Kosmiskt kaos och andra katastrofer, Krälande Cthulhu och andra bedrägliga blindskär, and Mardrömmar i midvintertid och andra morbiditeter, with authors such as Gull Åkerblom, Johan Theorin, Andreas Roman, K.G. Johansson and Rickard Berghorn. Johan Theorin's "Endast jag är vaken" (Mardrömmar i midvintertid och andra morbiditeter) was awarded with the Catahya Award for best science fiction, fantasy or horror short story published in Swedish 2007.

References 

Horror book publishing companies
Book publishing companies of Sweden